In music, Op. 49 stands for Opus number 49. Compositions that are assigned this number include:

 Beethoven – Piano Sonatas Nos. 19 and 20
 Brahms – Wiegenlied
 Chopin – Fantaisie in F minor
 Elgar – The Apostles
 Klebe – Jacobowsky und der Oberst
 Krenek – Der Diktator
 Mendelssohn – Piano Trio No. 1
 Milhaud – Little Symphony No. 2
 Schumann – Romanzen & Balladen volume II (3 songs)
 Scriabin – Prelude in F major, Op. 49, No. 2
 Shostakovich – String Quartet No. 1
 Sibelius  – Pohjola's Daughter
 Tchaikovsky – 1812 Overture